The 2011–12 Frölunda HC season is Frölunda HC's 32nd and current season in the top Swedish league, Elitserien (SEL). The regular season started on September 13, 2011 at home against newly promoted Växjö Lakers and ended on March 6, 2012 at home against Färjestad BK.

Regular season
On November 3, in a home game against Modo, early in the first period Frederik Andersen was run over by Modo's captain Ole-Kristian Tollefsen, who received a minor penalty for charging. Andersen's head struck the crossbar but he continued playing, allowing two goals despite making a spectacular save before the first period ended. During the first intermission, Andersen felt ill and decided to not return to the ice for the rest of the game. Hellberg stepped in and Frölunda managed to overcome their two-goal deficit by scoring four goals in the first nine minutes of the second period. In the third Modo's Nicklas Danielsson elbowed Joel Lundqvist in the face, causing a jaw fracture for Lundqvist. The game eventually ended in a 6–3 win, and Danielsson was reported to the Swedish Ice Hockey Association's Disciplinary Board the following day for checking to the head. Danielsson was suspended for two Elitserien games and one international Karjala Cup game, and was fined 11,000 SEK. In the following game on November 5 against Linköping—the last game before the Karjala Cup break—the injury list was further expanded when Magnus Kahnberg was hit blind-sided in the head by former teammate Sebastian Karlsson. Kahnberg fell unconscious, with his face first to the ice, and laid bleeding for several minutes before he was taken out on a stretcher. The hit resulted in Kahnberg being hospitalised with a severe concussion, a deep forehead laceration, and several teeth knocked out. Karlsson was ejected from the game for checking to the head, and received a match penalty. Karlsson was later suspended for eleven Elitserien games and three 2011 European Trophy playoff games. Frölunda suffered their first loss on home ice as the game ended 1–2, and Frölunda went into the break third in the standings with 37 points, two points short of then league leaders HV71.

Lundqvist returned to action on November 28, in a 1–4 loss against Färjestad. In early December, Pierre Johnsson was forced to undergo surgery for an inguinal hernia, sidelining him for four weeks.

After a great start of the season with a top 4 spot in the league, Frölunda fell back in December with only six points in nine games. As a result, Frölunda fell to the sixth spot in the league at 49 points. In a 2–6 loss on December 28 against AIK, Jari Tolsa was suspended for 2 games and fined 9,000 SEK for running over a linesman after an offside call. He returned on 12 January against Djurgården, a 3–2 overtime win, but after two hits on Jimmie Ölvestad and Daniel Tjärnqvist in that game, leaving both opponents with a concussion, he was re-suspended for 2 games and fined 9,000 SEK for the hit on Tjärnqvist. Kahnberg returned as well in that game, scoring one goal. Johnsson returned to action on January 3 in a 3–2 win against Linköping. Tolsa returned on January 18 in a 4–1 home win against Brynäs.

Standings

Games log

Playoffs
Each playoff series is a best-of-seven, meaning that four wins are required to advance to the next round.

Game log

Statistics

Skaters

Transactions
The off-season started with the decision from veterans Niklas Andersson and Andreas Karlsson to retire, and after a season of limited playing time Ville Mäntymaa decided to head back home to Finland. Early on Frölunda extended the contracts of Henrik Tömmernes and Nicklas Lasu, brought up Victor Backman from the junior team, and signed contracts with former Frölunda players Anton Axelsson and Jari Tolsa, and later on another returnee in Magnus Kahnberg. Despite offering to play at half his previous salary, and much to the dismay of the fans, Frölunda icon Tomi Kallio was not offered a new contract and eventually signed with Elitserien's newcomer Växjö Lakers. The goaltending was completely overhauled as goalie coach Michael Lehner, and goaltenders Johan Holmqvist and Joakim Lundström left the team and were replaced by goalie coach Micce Andréasson and his aspirant Magnus Hellberg, as well as Danish national Fredrik Andersen, and a local prospect Linus Fernström. The defence was also overhauled when Tobias Viklund, John Klingberg, and Oscar Hedman left the team, and Pierre Johnsson, Fredrik Eriksson, Christoffer Persson, and Swiss national Patrick von Gunten were brought in. After three seasons with Frölunda, assistant captain Riku Hahl left for Finland, and fellow Finn Mikko Mäenpää headed to the KHL, simultaneously Jesper Mattsson returned to Malmö after having settled the dispute which made him leave them and join Frölunda during the middle of the prior season. Finally junior defenceman Viktor Svedberg was signed to a pro-contract, and Frölunda's top duo from the 2009–10 season—Mathis Olimb and Fredrik Pettersson—returned home after their one-year sojourn in North America.

Drafted players

Frölunda HC players picked in the 2012 NHL Entry Draft at the Consol Energy Center in Pittsburgh, Pennsylvania.

References

External links
Frolundaindians.com — Official team website
Hockeyligan.se — Official league website
Swehockey.se — Official statistics website

2011-12
2011–12 Elitserien season